The University of Hyderabad (IAST: Hydarāvād visvavidyālayamu) is a top ranking public central research university located in Hyderabad, Telangana, India.

Founded in 1974, this mostly residential campus has more than 5,000 students and 400 faculty, from several disciplines. The governor of the state of Telangana is ex-officio the chief rector of the university, while the President of India is the visitor to the university.

The university was established along the lines of the Six-Point Formula of 1973. The first vice-chancellor of the university was Banaras Hindu University organic chemist Gurbaksh Singh, from 1974 to 1979. Shri B D Jatti was the first chancellor of the university.

In January 2015, the University of Hyderabad received the Visitor's Award for the Best Central University in India, awarded by the President of India.

The university is located in Gachibowli, on 2300-odd acres. The campus is rich in flora and fauna, home to over 734 flower plants, ten species of mammals, fifteen species of reptiles, and 220 species of birds.

The university is recognized as an Institute of Eminence (IoE) by the University Grants Commission (UGC) through the UGC (Declaration of Government Institutions as Institutions of Eminence) Guidelines, 2017 for public institutions

Campus 
The university campus is on 2300-odd acres, and has a large area under forest cover, with two perennial and three seasonal lakes, and rock formations characteristic of the Deccan. It is home to 734 plants, 10 mammals, 15 reptiles and 220 birds  species (at last count). Notable animals include spotted deer, hares, peacocks, porcupines and wild boar. The campus also has a protected megalithic site.

A study, which ranged over three decades (1990–2010), reported that of the plants present on campus, 315 species were used in traditional Indian medicine. 39 species of plants belonging to the group that faces the threat of extinction. These listings resulted from field studies done on campus by students and faculty members.

The university has plans to preserve the area under forest cover and wetlands by creating a bio reserve.

Academics

Teaching and learning 

The university follows the semester calendar beginning in mid-July and ending in early-May. About 90% of the students are residential. The Master's programme is usually of 2 years while the MPhil and PhD programme are of 18 months and 5 years respectively.

The university follows the continuous assessment pattern, with 40% marks awarded through assignments spread out through the semester and 60% through semester-end examinations. Grading is on a 10.0 point scale, with D being the lowest passing grade, and A+ being the highest. The toppers post-graduate courses are awarded medals.

Admission 
The university is primarily a post-graduate research university. UoH conducts its own entrance examinations for all courses during the months of May–June each year and interviews in the month of May annually. The university offers integrated M.Sc., M.A., MFA, M.Tech., M.B.A, M.C.A., MPhil and PhD degrees. Admissions to UoH are highly competitive. The university follows the positive-discrimination reservation system as per University Grants Commission of India guidelines.

Rankings 

The University of Hyderabad was ranked 601–650 in the QS World University Rankings of 2020. It is ranked 15 in India overall and sixth in India among universities by the National Institutional Ranking Framework in 2020. In 2020, the university was ranked 2nd among India's government universities by India Today.

Library 

The university library is a central facility to support teaching and research activities of the university. This present library building was inaugurated by Shankar Dayal Sharma, the then Vice President of India, on 21 October 1988 and named after late Prime Minister Indira Gandhi.

The library is connected to Campus Network. The library also created learning environment by establishing Online Public Access Catalog (WebOPAC), OPAC Searching Area, Internet browsing area, Laptop zone with Wi-Fi facility, specialised workstations & software for visually-challenged students and by facilitating electronic resources, search services/tools.

Indira Gandhi Memorial library is the first automated university library in the country. The library serves as a resources station to all scholars and has a print collection around 400,000, that include monographs, text books, back volumes of journals, theses / dissertations, CDs/DVDs. It subscribes around 500 print journals in various disciplines of the university and provides access to more than 25,000 e-resources including e-books. It also comprises a reading room which is accessible round-the-clock for the benefit of the students.

The Integrated Master's Programme 
College for Integrated Studies (CIS) was established in the year 2006 to offer 5-year Integrated master's degree courses. The centre offers 5-year integrated master's degree courses in Science, Humanities and Social Science subjects. The five-year Integrated M.A. (I.M.A.) and M.Sc. (I.M.Sc.) courses of the University of Hyderabad are trans-disciplinary programmes with core and elective subjects.

SIP: The Study in India Programme 

The University of Hyderabad's Study in India Programme (SIP) for foreign students began as a small experimental summer initiative where students from the University of Pittsburgh took nine credits over nine weeks in the summer of 1998. Since then, SIP has grown in leaps and bounds and has gone from hosting eight students in its debut year to nearly 200 in the most recent academic year. The University Grants Commission (UGC), a governmental organisation in India tasked with determining and maintaining standards for university education, has hailed the Study in India Programme as a model initiative and has encouraged other universities in India to emulate the program's approach. SIP's strength is its flexibility and willing to innovate to meet the needs of universities and study abroad consortia. SIP has created specialised, tailor-made programs for partners such as Dartmouth College, Duke University and the Nordic Centre in India—a consortium of 15 Nordic universities. Students can apply on their own, through their home schools, or through study abroad consortia that are SIP partners.

In 2014 the SIP Programme has been selected for IIE Andrew Heiskell Award. Thirteen Campuses in the world have been recognised for their Outstanding International Initiatives. UoH is the only University from Asia to be recognised.

Centre for Distance and Virtual Learning 
The University of Hyderabad started offering Post Graduate Diploma Programmes through distance mode since 1994. The target groups identified for these Programmes are (a) In service personnel looking forward to improve their skills and knowledge to enable to go up in the ladder in their own organisation or elsewhere and (b) Fresh graduate intending to improve their chances of employments on successful completion of these programmes.

Organisation and administration

Schools and departments 
 School of Mathematics and Statistics
 School of Physics
 School of Chemistry
 School of Life Sciences
 School of Computer and Information Sciences
 School of Social Sciences
 School of Humanities
 School of Engineering Sciences and Technology
 School of Management Studies
 School of Economics
 Sarojini Naidu School of Arts & Communication
 School of Medical Sciences

Academic Staff College 
Established in 1987 as a major initiative in augmenting quality in Higher Education, the UGC promoted 66 Academic Staff Colleges. The Academic Staff College of University of Hyderabad is a constituent unit of the university offering orientation, refresher and need-based courses for Assistant Professors / Associate Professors working in Universities and Colleges.

It is an important academic wing of the university.  Apart from the training programmes for teachers, the Academic Staff College conducts professional development programmes for principals and administrators. The faculty is also taking up the teaching assignments and research guidance in their respective departments.
National Assessment and Accreditation Council (NAAC) Peer Review Committee from Ministry of Human Resource Development (MHRD) visited Academic Staff College during 19 – 21 January 2012 for peer reviewing of its activities and accredited this Academic Staff College, University of Hyderabad as ranked no. 4 in India.

Research 
The university is a public research university with high research activity in every department, awarding about 300 doctorates each year. The university receives research funding from UGC, CSIR, DST, DBT, FIST and other funding agencies. The university is known for high quality research output from faculty and students in the natural sciences, social sciences, and humanities.

National Institute of Animal Biotechnology
National Institute of Animal Biotechnology (NIAB) is an autonomous institute under the Department of Biotechnology, Ministry of Science and Technology, Government of India established in the campus of University of Hyderabad.

Institute of Life Sciences
The Institute of Life Sciences (ILS) also known as Dr. Reddy's Institute of Life Sciences is a research organisation founded through a public–private partnership initiative in the year 2004. The partners in the making of ILS are the Government of Telangana the University of Hyderabad and Dr. Reddy's Laboratories. Incorporated as a not-for-profit company, ILS has been accorded recognition as a Scientific & Industrial Research Organisation (SIRO) by the Ministry of Science & Technology.

CR Rao Advanced Institute of Mathematics, Statistics and Computer Science

The CR Rao Advanced Institute of Mathematics, Statistics and Computer Science (AIMSCS) has been set up with the objective of promoting research and advanced studies in mathematics, Statistics, Computer Science and allied subjects.

Association of Management Development Institutions in South Asia
The Association of Management Development Institutions in South Asia (AMDISA) is a SAARC-recognised body. The association was established on the initiative of leading management Schools in the SAARC region and is located on the University of Hyderabad Campus in Gachibowli. AMDISA promotes management education and Management Development in the SAARC region and publishes the South Asian Journal of Management. The mission of AMDISA is to network management schools and management development centres; to promote partnerships between the schools, leading managers, and policy administrators; and to enhance the quality and effectiveness of management education and development in South Asia.

Student life

Hostels, canteens and recreational centres 

There are 21 hostels for students to stay in (13 for men and 8 for women). The Tagore International House caters to international students. There are two shopping complexes: one on the North campus and one on the South Campus. Also, there are seven canteens: the Students Centre Canteen, Goodwill Canteen, SN school canteen, F canteen, School of Chemistry canteen, Admin canteen, and School of Life Sciences canteen.

There are four multipurpose auditoriums within the campus. The DST Auditorium is the largest, with a capacity of 700. It is used mainly for cultural events, seminars, public talks, and screening of documentaries and movies. The CV Raman Auditorium, with a capacity of 200, is located inside the science complex, and serves as a conference and seminar hall. The BR Ambedkar Auditorium is mainly used for cultural events, public talks, debates, and other events. There is another auditorium located inside the humanities block.

Bol Hyderabad Community Radio Station
Bol Hyderabad 90.4 FM is the University of Hyderabad's Campus Radio Station which began operations from 15 August 2011. The range of the radio broadcast is around 15 kilometer radius around the campus covering areas of Tolichowki, Gopanapally, Hi-Tech City and Gachibowli areas of Hyderabad.

National Service Scheme Cell (NSS) 
In connection with 'Gandhi Jayanti Week'  Celebrations National Service Scheme (NSS) Cell, organises Peace March, Orientation Programmes, Tree plantation etc. during the first week of October every year.

Students' Union
Major student organisations on the campus include the All India students federation (AISF) Ambedkar Students' Association (ASA), Muslim Students Federation (msf), Akhil Bharatiya Vidyarthi Parishad (ABVP, "All Indian Student Council"), National Students' Union of India (NSUI), Students' Federation of India (SFI), Bahujan Students' Front (BSF), Dalit Students' Union (DSU), Telangana Students' Association (TSA), Other Backward Classes Federation (OBCF), All India Students Association (AISA ), and the Telangana Vidyarthi Vedika (TVV, Telangana Student Forum).

The Students' Union is elected annually, with elections being conducted by the students themselves, following the guidelines set by the Lyngdoh Committee. The Students' Union includes a president, vice-president, general secretary, joint secretary, sports secretary and cultural secretary. The elections are held during the month of September every year.

Sports events 
The elected Students' Union conducts various sports and cultural events for the students over the academic year.

Nari's Knight Cup

The first of such event is the Nari's Cricket Knight Cup. The tournament is named in memory of an Ex-student Mr. Narayan Reddy (Nari) who met with an unfortunate death in the campus premises.
Initially, a few friends of Mr.Narayan Reddy started this 5-over a side tournament with 9 players per side. However, the Students' Union took over the responsibility of conducting the Knight Cup later. The tournament is conducted under floodlights at the Open-Air auditorium.

Senthil Balraj Cricket Night Cup

The Senthil Balraj Cricket Night cup was initiated in February, 2011 by the then Students' Union in memory of Senthil and Balraj. This cricket night cup is unique in the sense that it is open to only the registered students and employees of the university while the Nari's Knight Cup is open to Alumni's as well as the students of the university. However, the format of both the competitions remains the same.

Football Night Cup

The Football Night cup is the third in the series of Night cups conducted by the Students' Union. The tournament is usually conducted in the last week of February every year. This is a 7-a-side tournament with a total match duration of 30 mins.

Basketball and Volleyball Night cup

The union also conducts basketball and volleyball night cups every year in the month of March.

Cultural festival 
Sukoon (सुकून, meaning peace) is the annual cultural festival of the university organised by the Students' Union during the month of March where students from colleges all over Hyderabad participate. The 3-day event includes various literary and other recreational events.

Entrepreneurship Development Cell 
The university has an ED Cell, located in the Management Block of the university, that has nurtured startups. Some of them include.

 Laundrette: A coin-operated washing machine service.

Controversies 
On 22 March 2016, police arrested 25 students and 2 faculty members who were reportedly protesting against the Vice Chancellor Appa Rao Podile's return to campus following the suicide of Rohith Vemula. All of them were granted bail on 28 March by the Metropolitan Magistrate at Miyapur court.

Chancellors

Vice chancellors 

 Gurbaksh Singh, 1974–1979
 B S Ramakrishna, 1980–1986
 Bhadriraju Krishnamurthi, 1986–1993
 Goverdhan Mehta, 1993–1998
 Palle Rama Rao, 1999–2002
 Kota Harinarayana, 2002–2005
 Seyed E Hasnain, 2005–2011
 Ramakrishna Ramaswamy, 2011 – 29 January 2015
 E Haribabu, 29 January – 31 May 2015
 R P Sharma, 1 June – 22 September 2015
 Appa Rao Podile, 23 September 2015 – 7 June 2021
 B. J. Rao, 26 July 2021 – present

Notable Alumni and Faculty 

 Girish Agarwal, FRS
 Dhevalapally B. Ramachary, professor of chemistry at University of Hyderabad
 D Sridhar Babu, Former Minister, Govt of Andhra Pradesh
 Manoj Abraham IPS, ADGP Kerala Police
 Rahul Banerjee (chemist), Shanti Swarup Bhatnagar laureate
 Dipankar Chatterji, recipient of Padma Shri and Shanti Swarup Bhatnagar Prize
 Goverdhan Mehta, FRS
 G. Naresh Patwari, chemist and Shanti Swarup Bhatnagar laureate
 D. Srinivasa Reddy
 Rohith Vemula
 G. Narahari Sastry, Bhatnagar Prize winner
 Shanta Sinha, Ramon Magsaysay Award winner
 Adusumilli Srikrishna
 Mallu Bhatti Vikramarka
 Geeta Kashyap Vemuganti, Ophthalmologist, N-Bios laureate
 Rohith Vemula, Dalit activist
 Ganesh Bagler, a pioneer of computational gastronomy
 Syed Akbaruddin, former permanent representative of India at the United Nations,
 Priyadarshi Pulikonda, Telugu Actor
Mohammed Baig Ehsas, Urdu writer

See also 
 Education in India
 Distance Education Council
 University Grants Commission (India)
 Bhartendu Academy of Dramatic Arts

References

External links 
 
 University of Hyderabad on LinkedIn

 
U
Central universities in India
Universities in Telangana
Educational institutions established in 1974
1974 establishments in Andhra Pradesh

sv:Centrala universitetet i Hyderabad